Barystethus is a genus of the true weevil family.

Species 
Barystethus contains the following accepted species:

 Barystethus aberrans
 Barystethus ater
 Barystethus basalis
 Barystethus chevrolati
 Barystethus cletusi
 Barystethus dispar
 Barystethus globithorax
 Barystethus imparatus
 Barystethus imperialis
 Barystethus macilentus
 Barystethus melanosoma
 Barystethus neopommeranus
 Barystethus parvulus
 Barystethus puncticollis
 Barystethus rufus
 Barystethus semitomentosus
 Barystethus tropicus
 Barystethus wahnesi

References 

 Catalogue of life
 Encyclopedia of Life
 Curculionidae Wtaxa
 G. P. Setliff  Annotated checklist of weevils from the Papuan region (Coleoptera, Curculionoidea)

Dryophthorinae
Beetles described in 1886